Yerson Candelo (born 24 February 1992) is a Colombian footballer who currently plays for Atlético Nacional in Colombian tournament Liga  Águila.

Club career

Deportivo Cali
Candelo was formed with Deportivo Cali and was a regular starter.

Queretaro
In 2015, Deportivo Cali and Queretaro F.C. reached terms for the 3 million dollar transfer of Candelo to "Los Gallos Blancos."

Atletico Nacional

On June 20, 2018 he signed for Colombian side Atlético Nacional, the club made official the signing of the midfielder through its social media.

International career
Candelo made his debut for the Colombia national team on 16 January 2022 in a 2–1 home win over Honduras.

Career statistics

Honours

Club
Querétaro
Copa MX: Apertura 2016
Supercopa MX: 2017

References

External links

 

1992 births
Living people
Colombian footballers
Colombia under-20 international footballers
Categoría Primera A players
Liga MX players
Deportivo Cali footballers
Querétaro F.C. footballers
Atlético Nacional footballers
Colombian expatriate footballers
Expatriate footballers in Mexico
Colombian expatriate sportspeople in Mexico
Footballers from Cali
Association football midfielders